The Jungfrau Marathon is one of the best known mountain marathons in the world, in full view of the famous Eiger, Mönch, and Jungfrau mountains in the Bernese Oberland area of the Swiss Alps.

The first Jungfrau Marathon was held in 1993.  Approximately 3,500 runners from 35 different nations participate. The Jungfrau Marathon takes place each year in September.

The 2007 edition of the competition incorporated the World Long Distance Mountain Running Challenge and attracted 4200 participants from 50 countries.

The course
The  course starts in Interlaken and climbs 6,407 feet (1,953 m) in elevation to the finish at the Eigergletscher. It used to finish at Kleine Scheidegg.  

The first 10 km of the course are flat.  The race begins in central Interlaken and circles around the town centre before moving east to Bönigen, where runners briefly run along the shore of Lake Brienz. The race proceeds southwards to Wilderswil at the 10 km mark. From there the course heads upward through Zweilütschinen (at 15 km) to Lauterbrunnen (at 20 km).  The course loops for 5 km south of the town before returning to Lauterbrunnen and then heading eastward up the alpside. It is at this point that the race is steepest, zigzagging up the hillside and climbing 450 m in the 5 km to Wengen.  The course heads southeast and relentlessly upward over the Wengernalp, turning east and then northeast beneath the Eiger toward the finish. It finishes at Eigerletscher at an altitude of 2,320 m. Shortly before leaving the moraine and turning towards the final ascent, the runners are traditionally greeted by a bagpipe player.

Past winners
Key:

References

External links
 
 Official Jungfrau-Marathon-Homepage
 Map of the Jungfrau Marathon course

Mountain marathons
Recurring sporting events established in 1993
Marathons in Switzerland
Interlaken
Autumn events in Switzerland